The Bird of Time is a poetry collection book by Indian poet Sarojini Naidu in 1912. The book consists of four chapters, which contain 47 poems in total. It is Naidu's second book and most strongly nationalist book of poems, published from both London and New York City. Inspired by Edmund Gosse work Naidu's work is steeped in the Romantic tradition while entirely conscious of the political and social strife of India.

In 2022, a plaque containing the poem "The Hussain Saagar", from the collection, was erected at Tank Bund Road. "In the Bazaars of Hyderabad" is another poem from The Bird of Time.

Contents
Songs of Love and Death

The Bird of Time
Dirge: In sorrow of her bereavement
An Indian Love Song
In Remembrance: Violet Clarke
Love and Death
The Dance of Love
A Love Song from the North
At Twilight: On the way to Golconda
Alone
A Rajput Love Song
A Persian Love Song
To Love

Songs of the Spring time

Spring
A Song in Spring
The Joy of the Springtime
Vasant Panchami: Lilavati's Lament at the Feast of Spring
In a Time of Flowers
In Praise of Gulmohur Blossoms
Nasturtiums
Golden Cassia
Champak Blossoms
Ecstasy

Indian Folk-Songs (To Indian Tunes)

Village Song
Slumber Song for Sunalini
Songs of my City:
In a Latticed Balcony
In the Bazaars of Hyderabad
Bangle-sellers
The Festival of Serpents
Song of Radha the Milkmaid
Spinning Song
Hymn to Indra, Lord of Rain

Songs of Life

Death and Life
The Hussain Saagar
The Faery Isle of Janjira
The Soul's Prayer
Transience
The Old Woman
In the Night
At Dawn
An Anthem of Love
Solitude
A Challenge to Fate
The Call to Evening Prayer
In Salutation to the Eternal Peace
Medley: A Kashmeri Song
Farewell
Guerdon

See also
Indian English literature

References

Further reading
 

Indian poems
Works by Sarojini Naidu